The 2004 MuchMusic Video Awards were held on June 19, 2004 and featured performances by the Beastie Boys, Evanescence, Billy Talent, Hilary Duff, Kanye West and others. The most nominated artist was Sam Roberts with 8 nominations.

Best Video
 Finger Eleven — "One Thing"
 Billy Talent — "Try Honesty"
 Nelly Furtado — "Powerless (Say What You Want)"
 Pilate — "Into Your Hideout"
 Sam Roberts — "Hard Road"

Best Director
 Sam Roberts — "Hard Road" (directed by: Kyle Davison)
 Billy Talent — "Try Honesty" (directed by: Sean Michael Turrell)
 Default — "Throw It All Away" (directed by: Andrew McNaughton)
 k-os — "Heaven Only Knows" (directed by: Don Allan)
 Pilate - "Into Your Hideout" (directed by: Maxime Giroux)

Best Post-Production
 Sam Roberts — "Hard Road"
 Billy Talent — "Try Honesty"
 Pilate — "Into Your Hideout"
 Sam Roberts — "Where Have All The Good People Gone"
 Universal Soul — "Way Back In The Day"

Best cinematography
 Sam Roberts — "Hard Road"
 Billy Talent — "Try Honesty"
 Default — "Throw It All Away"
 Jelleestone f. Elephant Man — "Who Dat"
 Pilate — "Melt Into The Walls"

Best Pop Video
 Nelly Furtado — "Powerless (Say What You Want)"
 Fefe Dobson — "Take Me Away"
 Hawksley Workman — "Anger as Beauty"
 Lillix — "Tomorrow"
 Sam Roberts — "Hard Road"

MuchLOUD Best Rock Video
 Billy Talent — "Try Honesty"
 Finger Eleven — "Good Times"
 Finger Eleven — "One Thing"
 Nickelback — "Someday"
 Three Days Grace — "I Hate (Everything About You)"

MuchVibe Best Rap Video
 Jelleestone f. Elephant Man — "Who Dat"
 Choclair — "Skyline"
 k-os — "Heaven Only Knows"
 Tone Mason f. Brassmunk, G. Stokes, Graph Nobel — "The Throwback"
 Universal Soul — "Way Back In The Day"

Best R&B Video
 In Essence — "Friend Of Mine"
 Big Black Lincoln — "Pimpin' Life"
 Keshia Chanté — "Unpredictable"
 Melanie Durrant f. Common — "Where I'm Going"
 Ray Robinson — "Missed Your Chance"

Best Independent Video
 Pilate — "Into Your Hideout"
 Alexisonfire — "Counterparts and Number Them"
 Sweatshop Union — "The Thing About It"
 The Trews — "Not Ready to Go"
 Tone Mason f. Brassmunk, G. Stokes, Graph Nobel — "The Throwback"

MuchMoreMusic Award
 Sarah McLachlan — "Fallen"
 Hawksley Workman — "We Will Still Need A Song"
 Nelly Furtado — "Powerless (Say What You Want)"
 Sam Roberts — "Hard Road"
 Shania Twain — "Forever and for Always"

Best French Video
 Corneille — "Parce qu'on vient de loin"
 Ariane Moffatt — "Poussière d'ange"
 Daniel Boucher — "Le vent soufflait mes pellicules"
 Stefie Shock — "L'amour dans le désert"
 Vulgaires Machins — "Anesthésie"

Best International Video – Artist
 Beyoncé Knowles f. Jay-Z — "Crazy in Love"
 50 Cent — "P.I.M.P"
 Britney Spears — "Toxic"
 Chingy — "Right Thurr"
 Christina Aguilera — "The Voice Within"
 Hilary Duff — "Come Clean"
 Kanye West f. Syleena Johnson — "All Falls Down"
 Ludacris f. Shawnna — "Stand Up"
 Missy Elliott — "Pass That Dutch"
 Usher f. Ludacris & Lil' Jon — "Yeah!"

Best International Video - Group
 Outkast — "Hey Ya!"
 Beastie Boys — "Ch-Check It Out"
 The Black Eyed Peas — "Where Is the Love?"
 Evanescence — "My Immortal"
 Good Charlotte — "Hold On"
 Hoobastank — "The Reason"
 Incubus — "Megalomaniac"
 Jet — "Are You Gonna Be My Girl"
 Steriogram — "Walkie Talkie Man"
 The Darkness — "I Believe in a Thing Called Love"

People's Choice: Favourite International Group
 Linkin Park — "Numb"
 Black Eyed Peas — "Where Is the Love?"
 Evanescence — "My Immortal"
 Good Charlotte — "Girls & Boys"
 Outkast — "Hey Ya!"

People's Choice: Favourite International Artist
 Usher f. Ludacris & Lil' Jon — "Yeah!"
 50 Cent — "P.I.M.P"
 Beyoncé f. Jay-Z — "Crazy In Love"
 Britney Spears — "Toxic"
 Hilary Duff — "Come Clean"

People's Choice: Favourite Canadian Group
 Simple Plan — "Perfect"''
 Billy Talent — "Try Honesty"
 Finger Eleven — "One Thing"
 Nickleback — "Someday"
 Three Days Grace — "I Hate (Everything About You)"

People's Choice: Favourite Canadian Artist
Avril Lavigne — "Don't Tell Me"
 Fefe Dobson — "Take Me Away"
 Hawksley Workman — "Anger as Beauty"
 Nelly Furtado — "Powerless (Say What You Want)"
 Sam Roberts — "Hard Road"

VideoFACT Award
 Alexisonfire — Counterparts And Number Them

Trail Blazer Award
Beastie Boys

Performers
The Beastie Boys - Ch-Check it Out
Billy Talent - Try Honesty
Evanescence - Everybody's Fool
Fefe Dobson - Take Me Away
Finger Eleven - One Thing
Hilary Duff - Come Clean
Hoobastank - The Reason
Kanye West with John Legend - Jesus Walks
Three Days Grace - I Hate Everything About You

References

 MuchMusic.com | MMVA04

MuchMusic Video Awards
Muchmusic Video Awards, 2004
Muchmusic Video Awards, 2004
2004 in Canadian music